was a Japanese novelist, essayist, and playwright  born in Iwamizawa, Hokkaidō Prefecture, Japan. During the 1980s and 1990s, she was one of the most popular authors released under Shueisha's Cobalt Bunko imprint. She is best known outside Japan for  I Can Hear the Sea,  later a Studio Ghibli movie. The cause of her death was determined as lung cancer.

Works

Novels
All titles published by Shueisha Cobalt imprint unless otherwise noted.

1970s
 (1978)
 (1979)

1980s
 (1980)
 (1980)
 (1981)
 (1981)
 (1981)
 (1982)
 (1983)
The Change! is a four-volume adaptation of Torikaebaya monogatari, a Heian-era tale.
 (1983)
 (1983)
 (1984)
 (1984)
 (1984)
 (1984)
 (1985)
 (1985)
 (1985)
 (1986)
 (1986)
 (1988)
 (1988)
 (1988)
 (1989)
 (1989)
 (1989, Kadokawa Shoten)
 (1989, Kadokawa Shoten)

1990s
 (1990)
 (1990)
 (1991)
 (1991)
 (1991, Shinchosha Nochi Bunko)
 (1991, Shueisha Nochi Bunko)
 vol.1-11 (1992–1996)
 (1993)
 (1993)
 (1995)

Essays
 (1987, Nochi Bunko)
 (1989, Nochi Bunko)
 (1990, Nochi Bunko)
 (1990, Shueisha Cobalt)
 (1990, Kadokawa SHoten)
 (1992, Nochi Bunko)
 (1993, Nochi Bunko)
 (1995, Nochi Bunko)

Translation
Ochikubo Monogatari (1993, Kodansha)

Collaboration
Boku ga Suki na Hito e (1993, with Katsuya Kondō, based on I Can Hear the Sea)

Play
Searching for Lady Anne

Works made into television dramas
Nante Suteki ni Japanesque (starring Yasuko Tomita)
I Can Hear the Sea II: Because There Is Love (1995, starring Shinji Takeda and Hitomi Satō)

Work made into radio drama
Nante Suteki ni Japanesque (NHK-FM, starring Satomi Kobayashi)

Works made into films
Clara Hakusho (1985, starring Shōjotai)
 Koisuru Onnatachi (1986, starring Yuki Saito)

Work made into anime
I Can Hear the Sea (1993, made by Studio Ghibli)

Manga
These manga were either written by Himuro or the original story idea was created by her.
 (Shogakukan, drawn by Yumi Kagawa)
 (Shogakukan, drawn by Kazuko Fujita)
 (Shueisha, drawn by Hiromi Tanigawa)

Works made into manga
Clara Hakusho (Shogakukan, Noa Misaki)
Agnes Hakusho (Shogakukan, Noa Misaki)
Nante Suteki ni Japanesque (Hakusensha, Naomi Yamauchi)
Zakkyo Jidai (Hakusensha, Naomi Yamauchi)
Warabigaoka Monogatari (Hakusensha, Naomi Yamauchi)
The Change! (Hakusensha, Naomi Yamauchi)
Shōjo Shōsetsu Ie wa Shinanai! (Hakusensha, Miyuki Nishizawa)
 Koisuru Onnatachi (Shueisha, Miyoko Nanbu)

Work made into picture book
Cinderella Mystery (Tokuma Shoten, artist: Mutsumi Inomata)

Works made into plays
Searching for Lady Anne
OSK Nippon Kagekidan produced this play in 1996. Michiru Kō starred in the debut performance at the Kintetsu Theatre.
Ralph Becker: Michiru Kō
Lady Anne: Mebae Kojō
The Change!
Theatre Echo produced this play from 2000-11-12 to 2000-11-21 at the Shinjuku Minamiguchi Kinokuniya Southern Theatre.
Produced by Haruhiko Jō
Script by Michihiro Ōtani
The female musical theater group Gekidan Star of Dreams production ran during September 2005 to celebrate the 15th anniversary of the Morinomiya Planet Station.
Produced by Kaori Ōra
Cinderella Mystery
Produced by Theatre Company Caramelbox in 1994 at the Tokyo Geijutsu Geijō Little Hall and Shinbashi Yakult Hall.
Produced by Ryūnosuke Kuse
Script by Yutaka Narui

References

1957 births
2008 deaths
Japanese essayists
Japanese women essayists
Japanese women novelists
Deaths from lung cancer
20th-century Japanese novelists
20th-century Japanese women writers
20th-century essayists
People from Iwamizawa, Hokkaido
Writers from Hokkaido
Fuji Women's University alumni